School Union 69 is a school district headquartered in Hope, Maine. It serves Hope, Appleton, and Lincolnville.

Its schools:
Appleton Village School - K-8
Hope Elementary School
Lincolnville Central School (LCS)

It feeds into Camden Hills Regional High School of the Five Town Community School District.

References

External links
 School Union 69

School districts in Maine
Education in Knox County, Maine